Gosfandi District is a district of Sar-e Pol Province, Afghanistan. After the Taliban's rise to power in the 1990s, they committed five massacres, killing some 96 people, in the district.

See also
 Districts of Afghanistan

References

Districts of Sar-e Pol Province